Nové Hutě is a municipality and village in Prachatice District in the South Bohemian Region of the Czech Republic. It has about 90 inhabitants.

Gallery

References

Villages in Prachatice District
Bohemian Forest